= Instruments of Africa =

Manufacturer of African electric guitars

Instruments of Africa (IOA)
- Company type: Private
- Industry: Innovation/Musical Instrument
- Key people: Ezekiel Olaleye (CEO)
- Website: instrumentsofafrica.com

Instruments of Africa (IOA) is an African manufacturer of electric guitars that are shaped like Africa. It was founded by Ezekiel Olaleye who is a Nigerian-American instrumentalist.

Instruments of Africa was initially introduced in the United States in 2016, incorporated in 2017, and was subsequently incorporated in Nigeria and United Kingdom.

In 2021, it launches nine models of guitars in Lagos, Nigeria which were all named after 9 cities across the continent of Africa.
